The Highest Commander of the Royal Thai Armed Forces is a position vested in the Thai monarch, who as sovereign and head of state is the commander-in-chief of the Royal Thai Armed Forces.

The position is only nominal. The armed forces are actually managed by the  Ministry of Defence, headed by the Minister of Defence (a member of the cabinet) and commanded by the Royal Thai Armed Forces Headquarters, which in turn is headed by the Chief of the Defence Forces.

History
Ever since the foundation of the first Thai state, the king has always led his armies into battle. The role of the king as chief warrior was derived from Hindu concepts of kshatriya, and later much influenced by the ideal of a chakravartin as defender of the realm. This martial responsibility has by tradition been borne by every Thai monarch since, but has never been formally instituted. By the 19th century, with the formal creation of a modern Thai army and navy in 1874 and 1887 respectively, the establishment of a formal chain of command was necessary. The titles of Supreme Head of Army (จอมทัพบก; Chom Thap Bok) and Supreme Head of the Navy (จอมทัพเรือ; Chom Thap Ruea) were created around the latter half of the reign of King Chulalongkorn for himself. After the end of the absolute monarchy in 1932, Siam's first permanent constitution established the ceremonial role of Head of the Siamese Armed Forces (จอมทัพสยาม; Chom Thap Sayam) in Article 1, Section 5. Since then Thailand has had 16 constitutions and the title has been enshrined in each of them.

Under the constitutional system, the king's post as head of the armed forces is a means for the monarchy to be closely related to the armed forces. The king participates in military activities and functions, including the presentation of ceremonial colours, based on the national flag, to various units of the armed forces and the presentation of ceremonial swords to all graduating officers of the military academies. The armed forces celebrate the king with an annual parade held on his birthday at the Royal Plaza in central Bangkok.

Insignia
Since 1910, starting with King Vajiravudh, it is customary for representatives of the armed forces to present the newly acceded monarch his insignia as Head of the Armed Forces, at a formal ceremony at the Grand Palace. These include a golden marshal's baton (featuring a Garuda), his shoulder boards, a sabre, and a golden aiguillette to be worn on the right shoulder.

List

References

See also
 Highest military ranks
 Monarchy of Thailand
 List of monarchs of Thailand
 Royal Thai Armed Forces
 Field marshal (Thailand)
 Admiral of the fleet (Thailand)
 Marshal of the Royal Thai Air Force
 Dai-gensui - Japanese equivalent
 Da yuan shuai - Chinese equivalent
 Taewonsu - Korean equivalent
 Royal Security Command

Thai monarchy
Thailand
Military of Thailand